The Academy Award for Best Animated Short Film is an award given by the Academy of Motion Picture Arts and Sciences (AMPAS) as part of the annual Academy Awards, or Oscars, since the 5th Academy Awards (with different names), covering the year 1931–32, to the present.

From 1932 until 1970, the category was known as Short Subjects, Cartoons; and from 1971 to 1973 as Short Subjects, Animated Films. The present title began with the 46th Awards in 1974. During the first 5 decades of the award's existence, awards were presented to the producers of the shorts. Current Academy rules, however, call for the award to be presented to "the individual person most directly responsible for the concept and the creative execution of the film." Moreover, "[i]n the event that more than one individual has been directly and importantly involved in creative decisions, a second statuette may be awarded."

Only American films were nominated for the award until the National Film Board of Canada (NFB) won with The Romance of Transportation in Canada in 1952. (The first non-English-language international short to win was Zagreb Film's Ersatz (The Substitute) in 1961.)

The first film to win in this category was Flowers and Trees by Walt Disney, who has since held the category's record for most nominations (39) and most wins (12). MGM's Tom and Jerry (1940–67) is the category's most lauded animated series over all, being nominated for a total of 13 Oscars and winning 7. Warner Bros.'s Looney Tunes/Merrie Melodies series also had a big amount of 16 Oscar nominations and winning 5. Among international studios, the NFB has the most wins in this category, with 6 Oscars. The biggest showing from Britain in this category is Nick Park, with three wins: 1 for Creature Comforts and 2 for the Wallace and Gromit series. 

The Academy defines short as being "not more than 40 minutes, including all credits." Fifteen films are shortlisted before nominations are announced. In the listings below, the title shown in boldface was the winner of the award in that given year, followed by the other nominees for that year.

Winners and nominees
All bars that are highlighted yellow were winners—with the title and name shown in boldface.

1930s

1940s

1950s

1960s

1970s

1980s

1990s

2000s

2010s

2020s

Notes

Superlatives 

For this Academy Award category, the following superlatives emerge:

 Most awards: Walt Disney  12 awards
 Most nominations: Walt Disney  39 nominations
 Most consecutive years: Walt Disney  8 years (1931-1939)
 Shortest winning film: The Crunch Bird (1971)  2 minutes
 Longest winning film: The Boy, the Mole, the Fox and the Horse (2022)  34 minutes
 Shortest nominated film: Fresh Guacamole (2012)  1 min. 44 sec.
 Longest nominated film: Pear Cider and Cigarettes (2016)  34 minutes 59 seconds.

Multiple nominations and awards 

The following is a list of animation studios or animators that earned multiple nominations and awards in this category.

Submissions

Animation historian Jerry Beck posted, on Cartoon Research, lists of animated shorts from various studios considered for nomination beginning with 1948—as documents prior could not be located—and ending so far with 1986.

Between those years, the following documentations were also missing: 1949, 1950, 1976, 1981, 1982 and 1985.

1937–47

1948–59

1960s

1970s

1980s

2009–present

See also 
 Submissions for Best Animated Short Academy Award
List of animation awards
 BAFTA Award for Best Short Film
 The 50 Greatest Cartoons: As Selected by 1,000 Animation Professionals
List of animated short films
Academy Award for Best Live Action Short Film
Academy Award for Best Animated Feature
 Submissions for Best Animated Feature Academy Award
List of Academy Awards for Walt Disney

Footnotes 

Animated Short Film
American animation awards

History of animation